Thomas or Tom Youngs may refer to:

Tom Youngs (born 1987), rugby union hooker for Leicester Tigers
Tom Youngs (footballer, born 1979), forward and football assistant manager
Tom Youngs (footballer, born 1994), forward for Myrtleford Savoy SC
Thomas Youngs (bef. 1760–aft. 1784), American politician in 7th New York State Legislature#Assemblymen

See also
Thomas Youngs House, Pittsford, Monroe County, New York
Thomas Young (disambiguation)